was a  after Eiso and before Chōtoku. This period spanned the years from November 990  through February 995.

Change of era
 990 : The new era name was created to mark an event or a number of events. The previous era ended and a new one commenced in Eiso 3, on the 7th day of the 11th month of 990.

Events of the Shōryaku era
 March 1, 991 (Shōryaku 2, on the 12th day of the 2nd month):  The former-Emperor En'yū died at the age of 33.
 992 (Shōryaku 3): Nara Governor Kujō Kanetoshi constructed a new temple complex named Shoryaku-ji in response to an Imperial edict.

Notes

References
 Brown, Delmer M. and Ichirō Ishida, eds. (1979).  Gukanshō: The Future and the Past. Berkeley: University of California Press. ;  OCLC 251325323
 Nussbaum, Louis-Frédéric and Käthe Roth. (2005).  Japan encyclopedia. Cambridge: Harvard University Press. ;  OCLC 58053128
 Titsingh, Isaac. (1834). Nihon Odai Ichiran; ou,  Annales des empereurs du Japon.  Paris: Royal Asiatic Society, Oriental Translation Fund of Great Britain and Ireland. OCLC 5850691
 Varley, H. Paul. (1980). A Chronicle of Gods and Sovereigns: Jinnō Shōtōki of Kitabatake Chikafusa. New York: Columbia University Press. ;  OCLC 6042764

External links
 National Diet Library, "The Japanese Calendar" -- historical overview plus illustrative images from library's collection

Japanese eras
10th century in Japan